Geoffrey Aronson is a writer and analyst, specializing in Middle East affairs. He was the director for Foundation for Middle East Peace and the editor of the bimonthly Report on Israeli Settlement in the Occupied Palestinian Territories until June 2014.  His articles on a wide range of contemporary policy and strategic issues appear regularly.

Books
He is the author of the following two books:
 From Sideshow to Center Stage: US Policy towards Egypt and Israel
 Palestinians, and the Occupied Territories: Creating Facts in the West Bank.

References 

Middle Eastern studies in the United States
American international relations scholars
Living people
American freelance journalists
Year of birth missing (living people)
Place of birth missing (living people)
21st-century American historians
21st-century American male writers
American male non-fiction writers